Elizardo Ramírez de Paula (born January 28, 1983) is a former Major League Baseball pitcher who played for the Philadelphia Phillies, Cincinnati Reds and Texas Rangers.

Ramírez was a typical finesse pitcher, with an average fastball that he threw anywhere from 88 to 92 MPH. He also threw an average curveball and an average changeup.

Professional baseball career

2000–03 seasons

2004 season
Ramírez was acquired by the Cincinnati Reds on August 11, 2004, as the player to be named later in an earlier trade involving starting pitcher Cory Lidle. Ramírez spent the season with four teams: Clearwater Threshers, Reading Phillies, and Chattanooga Lookouts before making his Major League debut with the Philadelphia Phillies.

2005 season
In , Ramírez split time between the Triple-A Louisville Bats and Cincinnati Reds.

2006 season
In , Ramírez made one start for the Dayton Dragons while the Reds were on the all-star break and started a few games early in the season for the Louisville Bats before being called up to the Cincinnati Reds. On August 2, Ramírez had a 4.22 ERA and at the time was the 3rd most consistent starting pitcher for the Reds. What followed was one of Jerry Narron's most infamous debacles to date. On August 12, the Reds were in extra innings with the Phillies when Narron used Ramírez in relief. He pitched 1/3 inning and took the loss when Narron intentionally walked the strikeout prone Ryan Howard to load the bases with nobody out to move the winning run to third base. Even so, the very next day, Ramírez still made his regularly scheduled start, pitching 1.1 innings and giving up 5 earned runs. His season ended on the disabled list.

2007 season
In , Ramírez made three starts in four appearances for the Reds and became a free agent after the season.

2008 season
After signing with the Texas Rangers during the off-season, Ramírez started  with the Triple-A Oklahoma Redhawks, before being called up on June 4. In his season debut that same day, Ramírez gave up eight runs in 2 innings of relief. He was designated for assignment on June 8.

2009 season
On January 1, Ramírez re-signed with the Texas Rangers, to a minor league contract.

External links

1983 births
Living people
Chattanooga Lookouts players
Cincinnati Reds players
Clearwater Phillies players
Dayton Dragons players
Dominican Republic expatriate baseball players in the United States
Frisco RoughRiders players
Florida Complex League Phillies players

Louisville Bats players
Major League Baseball pitchers
Major League Baseball players from the Dominican Republic
Oklahoma City RedHawks players
Oklahoma RedHawks players
People from Santo Domingo Norte
Philadelphia Phillies players
Reading Phillies players
Texas Rangers players